Donorbox is a US-based technology company. It offers an online fundraising software that allows individuals and nonprofit organizations to receive donations over the Internet. It is used by charities, churches, mosques, schools, animal rescue organizations, political campaigns and other causes. They have attracted controversy over their provision of service to far-right figures.

The company was founded in 2014 and it is based in San Francisco, California.

Background 
Donorbox was founded in 2014 as and launched as a free WordPress plug-in with PayPal and Stripe. However, there is a $1,000 limit per month with a transaction fee of 1.5% for contributions exceeding the limit. Secured by SSL/TLS, it is PCI compliant. In 2018, the website enabled an Apple Pay mobile payment option for nonprofit organizations.

Donorbox serves customers in over 30 countries and territories. The company’s user base includes Truthout, MAP International, Habitat for Humanity, Code for America, and National Suicide Prevention Lifeline.

Reception 
42 Strategies commended Donorbox with "pre-filled custom amounts with descriptions to let your donors feel great by knowing what they’re contributing to." Double the Donation praised the site with "It’s so simple to use." Lykkes Natalie De Vicenzi exclaimed "Free?? Yes, free!" WPDean received it favorably with "The design is responsive and mobile-ready." WP Villa mentioned Donorbox in their recent blogposts.

Controversy 
Donorbox temporarily banned far-right activist Tommy Robinson in December 2018, after he created a campaign to raise money for Bailey McLaren, a UK teen who was arrested after a video emerged of him allegedly 'waterboarding' a Syrian refugee in a schoolyard incident. The company ran into controversy by deleting from its Terms of Service a requirement for users not to promote hate speech views. Robinson has since been reinstated onto the platform. Donorbox has since changed their terms and as of August 2019, amended their Terms of Service to add the requirement for users not to engage in, encourage, promote, or celebrate “unlawful violence toward any group based on race, religion, disability, gender, sexual orientation, national origin, or any other immutable characteristic”.

In January 2019, Far-right activist James Goddard  was banned by Facebook and PayPal due to violating their terms on hate speech  and after his arrest for harassment of MP Anna Soubry.  He was allowed to use Donorbox as a fundraising platform. As well as Robinson and Goddard, current users of the platform include the Jolene Bunting, Raheem Kassam, Matt Forney, and Danny Thomas.

Donorbox's removal of the requirement for those using its services not to promote racism or other hate speech has seen their popularity increase amongst extremist right-wing groups and individuals who have been banned by other fundraising platforms for terms of service violations. Previous right-wing platform users who are currently unable to use Donorbox include English Defence League, Der Dritte Weg, and Colin Robertson (AKA Millennial Woes). Other users who have also been banned by Donorbox for violating the company’s Terms of Services include PopMobPDX, The Brother Nathanael Foundation, and The Realist Report.

See also
Comparison of crowdfunding services
Crowdfunding
Crowdsourcing

References

External links 

Crowdfunding platforms of the United States
WordPress